A backstory, background story, back-story, or background is a set of events invented for a plot, presented as preceding and leading up to that plot. It is a literary device of a narrative history all chronologically earlier than the narrative of primary interest. 

In acting, it is the history of the character before the drama begins, and is created during the actor's preparation. 

It is the history of characters and other elements  that underlie the situation existing at the main narrative's start. Even a purely historical work selectively reveals backstory to the audience.

Usage
As a literary device, backstory is often employed to lend depth or believability to the main story. The usefulness of having a  dramatic revelation was recognized by Aristotle, in Poetics.

Backstories are usually revealed, partially or in full, chronologically or otherwise, as the main narrative unfolds. However, a story creator may also create portions of a backstory or even an entire backstory that is solely for their own use.

Backstory may be revealed by various means, including flashbacks, dialogue, direct narration, summary, recollection, and exposition. The original  Star Wars film and its first two sequels are examples of a work with a preconceived backstory, which was later released as the "prequel" second set of three films.

Recollection 
Recollection is the fiction-writing mode whereby a character calls something to mind, or remembers it. A character's memory plays a role for conveying backstory, as it allows a fiction-writer to bring forth information from earlier in the story or from before the beginning of the story. Although recollection is not widely recognized as a distinct fiction-writing mode, recollection is commonly used by authors of fiction.

For example, Orson Scott Card observes that "If it's a memory the character could have called to mind at any point, having her think about it just in time to make a key decision may seem like an implausible coincidence . . . ." Furthermore, "If the memory is going to prompt a present decision, then the memory in turn must have been prompted by a recent event."

Shared universe 
In a shared universe more than one author may shape the same backstory. The later creation of a backstory that conflicts with a previously written main story may require the adjustment device known as retroactive continuity, informally known as "retcon".

Acting
Actors may create their own backstories for characters, going beyond the sometimes meager information in a script. Filling in details helps an actor interpret the script and create fully imagined characters.

See also 

 Characterization
 Flashback (narrative)
 Origin story
 Prequel

References 

Continuity (fiction)
Narrative techniques
Plot (narrative)
Acting